The 12th Annual Honda Civic Tour was a concert tour headlined by American pop rock band Maroon 5, alongside special guest, American pop rock singer Kelly Clarkson. Sponsored by Honda Motor Company, the tour also featured Rozzi Crane and The Voice season 2 contestant Tony Lucca, as well as American R&B singer PJ Morton as its supporting acts. With 33 dates, the 12th installment of the tour was the longest, which began on August 1, 2013, in Maryland Heights, Missouri at the Verizon Wireless Amphitheater and ended on October 6, 2013, at the Hollywood Bowl in Los Angeles.

Opening acts

 Rozzi Crane
 Tony Lucca 
 PJ Morton

Setlists

Tour dates

Box office
On June 4, 2013, it was announced that the Maryland Heights, Burgettstown, Mansfield, Holmdel, Wantagh, Clarkston, Austin, The Woodlands, Denver, Irvine and Los Angeles show were sold out.

Cancelled dates

Notes

References

External links
 

2013 concert tours
Maroon 5 concert tours
Kelly Clarkson concert tours
Co-headlining concert tours
Concert tours of North America
Concert tours of the United States
Concert tours of Canada